Wilfred Paling (7 April 1883 – 17 April 1971) was a British Labour Party politician.

He was born at Marehay, near Ripley, Derbyshire, one of eight children of a coalminer. Paling left Ripley Elementary School at the age of 13, and entered casual employment  with local plumbing and building companies. When the family moved to Huthwaite in Nottinghamshire he started work in New Hucknall Colliery, also attending night classes organised by the Workers Educational Association in politics, economics and trade union history. He subsequently won a scholarship to study mining at University College Nottingham. Returning to the Nottinghamshire Coalfield, he became an official in the local miners' federation and a member of the Independent Labour Party.

In 1912 he left Nottinghamshire as his union and political activities meant that he could not find employment in the area. He moved to the West Riding of Yorkshire to work at Bullcroft Colliery near Doncaster. He was soon after elected to the committee of the Yorkshire Miners' Association, and in 1917 became colliery checkweighman. He entered local politics in 1919 when he was elected to the West Riding County Council and to Bentley with Arksey Urban District Council.

At the 1922 general election Paling was elected Member of Parliament (MP) for Doncaster, and was re-elected in 1923, 1924 and 1929. Paling was a Junior Lord of the Treasury 1929–1931. He was defeated at the 1931 general election, when the Labour Party lost many seats to candidates of the National Government.

In 1933 he returned to the Commons when he was returned unopposed at a by-election at Wentworth. He was re-elected at the general elections of 1935 and 1945. He had the largest majority of any MP in the 1945 general election: 35,410.

He joined the wartime coalition government as a Lord Commissioner of the Treasury, in 1940 and was Parliamentary Secretary to the Ministry of Pensions from 1941 to 1945. He was appointed a Privy Counsellor in 1944. In the Labour Government formed after the war he was Minister of Pensions, from 1945 – 1947; and Postmaster General from 1947 – 1950.

The Wentworth constituency was abolished by the Representation of the People Act 1948 with effect from the 1950 general election. Paling was elected for the new seat of Dearne Valley, and was re-elected in 1955. He retired from parliament at the 1959 general election.

Paling married Elizabeth Hunt of Huthwaite, and they had two children. He died at his home in Scawthorpe, near Doncaster, in April 1971.

References

External links 
 
 

1883 births
1971 deaths
Alumni of the University of Nottingham
Labour Party (UK) MPs for English constituencies
Members of the Privy Council of the United Kingdom
Miners' Federation of Great Britain-sponsored MPs
Ministers in the Churchill wartime government, 1940–1945
National Union of Mineworkers-sponsored MPs
People from Ripley, Derbyshire
People from the Metropolitan Borough of Doncaster
UK MPs 1922–1923
UK MPs 1923–1924
UK MPs 1924–1929
UK MPs 1929–1931
UK MPs 1931–1935
UK MPs 1935–1945
UK MPs 1945–1950
UK MPs 1950–1951
UK MPs 1951–1955
UK MPs 1955–1959
United Kingdom Postmasters General
Ministers in the Attlee governments, 1945–1951